Manuel Deluchi (born c. 1884) was an Argentine footballer who played as a defender for Racing Club de Avellaneda and Club Atlético Independiente.

Career 

He began his career in the early 1900s at Racing Club. On June 9, 1907, Deluchi played in his first derby between Racing and Independiente. The match result was 3-2 in favor of Independiente.
In 1908, Deluchi started playing for Club Atlético Independiente, team where he won the Copa Bullrich of 1909. In 1912, he ascended to the first division. The same year, Independiente lost the Championship against Club Atlético Porteño.

References

External links 
www.ole.com.ar

1880s births

Year of birth uncertain
Year of death missing
Argentine footballers
Footballers from Buenos Aires
Racing Club de Avellaneda footballers
Club Atlético Independiente footballers
Argentine Primera División players
Sportspeople from Avellaneda
Association football defenders
Argentine people of Italian descent